Dimmitt may refer to:
Dimmitt, Texas
Philip Dimmitt, major figure in the Texas Revolution
Dimmitt (meteorite), fell close to Dimmitt, Texas

See also 
Dimmit County, Texas